Enrico Pollastrini (15 June 1817, Livorno – 19 January 1876, Florence) was an Italian history painter and art school director.

Life and work
He began his training as an assistant in the workshop of a local artist named Vincenzo De Bonis. In 1829, aged only twelve, he enrolled at the Accademia di Belle Arti di Firenze, where he studied under the guidance of Pietro Benvenuti, Giuseppe Bezzuoli, Giovanni Fattori and Silvestro Lega. From 1835 to 1841, he created thirty-two scenes from The Betrothed; a project commissioned by the French entrepreneur, to decorate his mansion in Livorno.

In 1837, he held his first exhibition at the Accademia. Four years later, he presented a depiction of Columbus at La Rabida Friary and, in 1843, one depicting the death of Francesco Ferruccio. In 1845, Leopold II, Grand Duke of Tuscany, commissioned him to create a scene showing a family being saved from flooding along the Serchio.

Two years later, he was named a Professor at his alma mater, the Accademia. He became a regular participant at the cultural salons in the home of the architect, and his wife, the Irish-born poet, Louisa Grace Bartolini.

He was elected a member of the Accademia ligustica di belle arti in 1859. The following year, he became a member of the advisory commission for fine arts for the provinces of Arezzo and Florence. It depicted the fall of the Republic of Siena in 1555, when many of its inhabitants fled after its occupation by Emperor Charles V. It was lost during World War II.

He became Director of the Accademia in 1867 and served until 1875. He died the following year, after a long illness. His students there included Egisto Ferroni, Francesco Gioli, Tito Lessi, Luigi Bechi, Odoardo Borrani, Cesare Bartolena, Niccolò Cannicci, Vittorio Matteo Corcos, and Stefano Ussi.

Sources

 Luigi Servolini, Enrico Pollastrini, Livorno, Liburni Civitas, 1928

External links

 Biography from the Dizionario Biografico degli Italiani @ Treccani
 Biographical notes @ the Museo Civico Giovanni Fattori

1817 births
1876 deaths
People from Livorno
19th-century Italian painters
Italian male painters
Painters from Tuscany
Accademia di Belle Arti di Firenze alumni
Academic staff of the Accademia di Belle Arti di Firenze
19th-century Italian male artists